The Guardian Service Processor (also referred as GSP) is a subsystem within several models of server computers made by HP.

It is a separate computer system within the server that allows some service tasks. It is available as long as the system is supplied with power, even when the main operating system (usually HP-UX) is shut down, defective or not installed at all.

Common tasks of the GSP are:
 Alert display configuration
 Automatic System Restart configuration
 Remote Power Control (if the system is managed from remote)
 Configure asynchronous/serial ports
 Display of several status values
 Reset system ("reboot")
 Show logs (chassis code buffer)
 System status of proc. modules
 LAN configuration for console port
 Firmware upgrades

External links
 

Hewlett-Packard products